Bank of Tianjin (simplified Chinese: 天津银行: Tiānjīn yínháng) is a city commercial bank headquartered in Tianjin, People's Republic of China and regulated by the People's Bank of China.

Overview 
Bank of Tianjin (BoT) serves customers through a network of 109 branches across the major cities in the country. In 2015, the bank ranked 219 in terms of tier-one capital by the "Global Banking 1000" list by the UK based Banker magazine . , the bank had 306 outlets and an asset base of RMB 564 billion (US$84.6 billion).

History 
Bank of Tianjin was founded on 6 November 1996 as Tianjin City Co-operative Bank to serve the local communities of the city. In May 1998 the bank was renamed to Tianjin City Commercial Bank.

In March 2007, the bank's name was yet again changed to Bank of Tianjin. This was after receiving foreign direct investment of US$111.4 million from Australian based banking giant, ANZ Group. This gave ANZ group a 20% stake in Bank of Tianjin. The same year saw the bank expand its operations into Beijing.

March 2016 saw the bank list  H shares on the Hong Kong Stock exchange after an IPO that was led by BOC International, ABC International and CCB International. The bank managed to raise US$950 million in the public offering short of the US$1.23 billion that the bank was initially targeting. After the IPO, the bank was caught in a $122 million fraud incident at its Shanghai branch. Agricultural Bank of China was said to be investigating a similar incident

Investments 
Other than its banking core business, Bank of Tianjin holds a 35% stake in Tianjin Jixian County Bank Co. Ltd, a commercial bank in Jixian County, China. BoT initially held a 53.87% in Tianjin Jixian County Bank but later on ceded stake to other investors.

Ownership 
The shares of the stock of Bank of Tianjin are traded on the Hong Kong Stock Exchange, under the ticker: 1578. , the shareholding in the bank's stock was as depicted in the table below:

Governance 
Bank of Tianjin is governed by an fourteen-person Board of Directors with Yuan Fuhua serving as the Chairman of the group and Yuanhua Wen as the President and Executive Director.

See also 
 Banking in China
 Tianjin

References

External links 
 
China Banking Association (official website)

Banks established in 1996
Banks of China
1996 establishments in China
Companies based in Tianjin
Companies listed on the Hong Kong Stock Exchange